The Elms may refer to various buildings and other places:

In Canada
The Elms, Toronto, a neighbourhood in Toronto

In Great Britain
The Elms, Abberley an old established house, now a hotel and restaurant, in Abberley, Worcestershire, England
The Elms (Bedhampton) an historic Gothic house in Bedhampton, United Kingdom
The Elms (North Wingfield, Derbyshire), a grade II listed house
The Elms School, a school in Colwall, England
The Elms School, a school near Nottingham and Derby, England
The Elms, an electoral ward of Magor with Undy, Monmouthshire, Wales

In the United States
The Elms (Altheimer, Arkansas), listed on the NRHP in Jefferson County, Arkansas
The Elms (Woodland, Georgia), listed on the NRHP in Talbot County, Georgia
E. H. Gibbs House, in Oskaloosa, Iowa, also known as The Elms at Ridge Place
The Elms (Harrodsburg, Kentucky), listed on the NRHP in Mercer County, Kentucky
The Elms (Watertown, Massachusetts) (1710), historic home of the prominent Whitney family
The Elms (Houlton, Maine), listed on the NRHP in Aroostook County, Maine
Elms (Mechanic Falls, Maine), listed on the NRHP in Maine
The Elms (Natchez, Mississippi), listed on the NRHP in Adams County, Mississippi
Elms Hotel (Excelsior Springs, Missouri), a hotel in Excelsior Springs, Missouri
The Elms (Newport, Rhode Island), a mansion or  "summer cottage", listed on the NRHP in Rhode Island
The Elms (Franklin, Virginia), listed on the NRHP in Virginia

Other
The Elms (band), a rock and roll band from Seymour, Indiana USA
The Elms (mission station), New Zealand mission station founded by Alfred Brown